Robert Andrew Lloyd  (born 2 March 1940) is an English operatic bass.

Early life and education
Born in Southend-on-Sea, Essex, Lloyd was educated at Keble College, Oxford, and studied in London with the baritone Otakar Kraus.

Career
He made his  debut with University College Opera in 1969 as Don Fernando in Leonore, the early version of Fidelio. From 1969 to 1972 he was Principal Bass with the Sadler's Wells Opera Company (now English National Opera), and from 1972 to 1982 was a member of the Royal Opera, Covent Garden. He made 195 appearances with the Metropolitan Opera, New York City, during the period 1988-2008.

He has sung leading roles at Glyndebourne and with other British opera companies, and has appeared in major opera houses throughout the world. He sings roles in British, German, Italian, French and Russian works (Claggart and Superintendent Budd in Benjamin Britten's Billy Budd and Albert Herring, the Priest and Angel of Agony in Edward Elgar's The Dream of Gerontius; Sarastro in The Magic Flute, Osmin in The Abduction from the Seraglio, Rocco in Fidelio, Seneca in The Coronation of Poppea, Gurnemanz in Parsifal, Fasolt in Das Rheingold; Don Basilio in The Barber of Seville, Fiesco in Simon Boccanegra, Philippe II in Don Carlos; Arkel in Pelléas et Mélisande, Comte des Grieux in Manon, Narbal in Les Troyens; the title-role in Boris Godunov).  He also sings sacred music and has recorded as bass soloist in the Mozart Requiem.

Adult life
He was made a Commander of the Order of the British Empire (CBE) in 1991 for his services to music.

Lloyd has four children.   The eldest is Marcus Lloyd, a playwright and dramatist.

Recordings 
Robert Lloyd has made numerous recordings, including:

Albert Herring [as Superintendent Budd] (conductor:  Steuart Bedford), 1996, Naxos
Il barbiere di Siviglia (conductor:  Sir Neville Marriner), 1983, Philips
Béatrice et Bénédict (conductor: Sir Colin Davis), 1977, Philips
La bohème (conductor:  Sir Colin Davis), 1979, Philips
I Capuleti e i Montecchi (conductor:  Giuseppe Patanè, 1975, EMI
Carmen (conductor: Claudio Abbado), 1977, DG
Les contes d'Hoffmann [as Crespel] (conductor:  Julius Rudel), 1972, Westminster
Don Giovanni (conductor:  Sir Neville Marriner), 1990, Philips
Don Carlo (conductor: Bernard Haitink), 1997, Philips
The Dream of Gerontius (conductor:  Sir Adrian Boult), 1975, EMI
Die Entführung aus dem Serail (conductor:  Sir Colin Davis), 1978, Philips
La fanciulla del West (conductor:  Zubin Mehta), 1977, DG
Fidelio (conductor:  David Parry), 2005, Chandos
Lucia di Lammermoor (conductor:  Nicola Rescigno), 1983, EMI
Macbeth (conductor: Giuseppe Sinopoli), 1983, Philips
Great Mass in C Minor - Mozart (chorus master: László Heltay), 1994, Philips
Messiah - Haendel (conductor: Sir Neville Marriner), Dublin 1992, Philips DVD
A Midsummer Night's Dream (conductor:  Sir Colin Davis), 1996, Philips
Missa da Requiem - Verdi (conductor: Richard Hickox), 1996, Chandos
Le nozze di Figaro (conductor:  Sir Neville Marriner), 1986, Philips
Parsifal (conductor:  Armin Jordan), 1981, Erato
Requiem - Donizetti (conductor: Leonard Bernstein), 1982, DG
Requiem - Mozart (conductor: Sir Neville Marriner), 1991, Philips
Das Rheingold (conductor:  Sir Reginald Goodall), 1975, Chandos
Werther (conductor:  Sir Colin Davis), 1981, Philips
Die Zauberflöte (conductor:  Sir Charles Mackerras), 1991, Telarc

He can be seen on video as Boris Godunov, Rocco, Gurnemanz, Seneca and as Daland in The Flying Dutchman. He sang the title role in the 1988 film (director, Lesley Megahey) of Béla Bartók's opera Duke Bluebeard's Castle.

See also
 Massenet: Werther (Colin Davis recording)
 Mozart: La clemenza di Tito (Colin Davis recording)

References

External links 
 
Biography and photo
Interview with Robert Lloyd, January 22, 1991
Singing in FIDELIO (YouTube video)
King Philip II in DON CARLO

1940 births
Living people
English opera singers
Operatic basses
Commanders of the Order of the British Empire
Music in Southend-on-Sea
Alumni of Keble College, Oxford
Fellows of Keble College, Oxford
People from Southend-on-Sea
Musicians from Essex
English basses
Presidents of the Independent Society of Musicians